Mashal Mohammad Al-Zaben (born 1953) was the Chairman of the Joint Chiefs of Staff of the Jordanian Armed Forces between 23 February 2010 and 2 October 2016.
On 22 May 2012 Al-Zaben was promoted to General, and received the Istiqlal Medal of the First Order.

Al-Zaben is the current Military Advisor for King Abdullah II of Jordan, he received his position on 7 January 2015.

References

1953 births
Living people
Jordanian generals